Charles J. Colgan Sr. High School is the 12th high school located in Prince William County, Virginia. The school is located at 13833 Dumfries Rd, Manassas, Virginia.  The school opened in August 2016 and is named for American politician and businessman Charles J. Colgan.

Colgan High School serves a portion of the middle of Prince William County. The community consists of business, professional, U.S. Government and military residents. Colgan High School has also been designated as The Center for the Fine and Performing Arts.

Administration 
The principal of Colgan High School is Dr. Timothy Healey. Before being appointed the inaugural principal, he was an assistant superintendent and the Principal of Osbourn Park High School.

Demographics

In the 2017–2018 school year, Colgan's student body was:
18.6% Black/African American
17.4% Hispanic 
49.1% White
7.1% Asian
7.0% Two or More Races
.4% American Indian/Alaskan
.3% Hawaiian/Pacific Islander

Programs 
Currently, Colgan High School is the CFPA (Center for Fine and Performing Arts).  The CFPA consists of nine different programs.
 Dance
 Choir
 Orchestra
 Creative Writing
 Band
 Theater
 Music Technology
 Piano
 Visual Arts
Each of the programs require an audition/portfolio, depending on the concentration area.

Athletics 
In 2021, the Colgan girl's volleyball team won the class 6A state championship.

Architecture
Colgan High School is built based on a design model that focuses on natural light, open courtyard spaces, and current technology. Colgan High School has several design features that make it unique and tailored for students in the arts:

Largest auditorium in Prince William County Schools with professional sound and lighting;
Purposely designed Black Box Theater to allow for small performances and support student creativity;
Outdoor amphitheater with covered stage;
Large contemporary dance studio;
Hydraulic lift for orchestra pit allowing for effective use of stage (including stage extension);
Large art rooms with new equipment and supplies overlooking a beautiful courtyard;
Dedicated space for band, orchestra, and chorus – including Wenger© soundproof practice rooms.

Colgan High School also includes the School Division's Aquatics Center. While the Aquatics Center is physically attached to the school, it serves the entire School Division. The Aquatics Center is used by all students in Prince William County Schools  through swim & dive team practices and meets, and instructional purposes for water safety, lifeguard certification, and other related curricula.

References

External links
 Official website

Schools in Prince William County, Virginia
Public high schools in Virginia
Educational institutions established in 2016
2016 establishments in Virginia